Saif Kerawala (born June 23, 1997) is an American soccer player who currently plays college soccer at the University of Washington.

Career
Kerawala began his career with Eastside FC before spending one season with the Seattle Sounders FC Academy.  On February 6, 2015, it was announced that Kerawala signed a letter of intent to play college soccer at the University of Washington.  On May 20, he made his professional debut for Seattle Sounders FC 2 in a U.S. Open Cup match against PDL side Kitsap Pumas.  S2 won the match 4–2 in extra time.  He made his second Open Cup appearance a week later in a 2–1 victory over Portland Timbers 2 in extra time.  His USL debut came on July 18 in a 1–1 draw against Colorado Springs Switchbacks FC.

Despite appearing for S2, Kerawala was able to maintain his college eligibility.

References

External links
 Washington Huskies bio
 USSF Development Academy bio

1997 births
Living people
American soccer players
Washington Huskies men's soccer players
Tacoma Defiance players
Washington Crossfire players
Association football goalkeepers
Soccer players from Washington (state)
USL Championship players
USL League Two players